Dillwynella ingens is a species of sea snail, a marine gastropod mollusk in the family Skeneidae.

Description
The height of the shell attains 4.8 mm, its diameter 5.65 mm.

Distribution
This marine species is endemic to New Zealand, found off the Chatham Islands at a depth of 1140 m.

References

 Marshall, B.A. 1988: Skeneidae, Vitrinellidae and Orbitestellidae (Mollusca: Gastropoda) associated with biogenic substrata from bathyal depths off New Zealand and New South Wales. Journal of Natural History 22: 949-1004

External links
 To World Register of Marine Species

ingens
Gastropods described in 1988